Mexicano (or Mejicano) was a 112-gun three-decker ship of the line built at Havanna for the Spanish Navy in 1786 to plans by Romero Landa. One of the eight  very large ships of the line of the Santa Ana class, also known as los Meregildos. Mexicano served in the Spanish Navy for three decades throughout the French Revolutionary and Napoleonic Wars, finally being sold at Ferrol in 1815. Although she was a formidable part of the Spanish battlefleet throughout these conflicts, the only major action Mexicano participated in was the Battle of Cape St Vincent in 1797.

Construction
The Santa Ana class was built for the Spanish fleet in the 1780s and 1790s as heavy ships of the line, the equivalent of Royal Navy first rate ships. The other ships of the class were the Santa Ana,  Conde de Regla, Salvador del Mundo, Real Carlos, San Hermenegildo, Reina María Luisa and Príncipe de Asturias. Three of the class were captured or destroyed during the French Revolutionary Wars.
Mexicano was constructed at Havanna, built over eleven months in 1785 at a cost of 328,000 pesos, most of which was supplied by the Cabildo of New Spain, known as Mexico and from where the ship took its name.

History
The maiden voyage of Mexicano was made from Havanna to Ferrol with a light armament  of 80 guns under Captain Miguel Felix Goycoechea, who reported that the ship sailed smoothly and with endurance.

In 1797, Mexicano was with the Spanish fleet which fought the British at the Battle of Cape St Vincent. The Spanish fleet was defeated and four ships were lost, although Mexicano survived the battle with losses of 25 killed, including Captain Francisco de Herrara and 46 seriously wounded.
Between 1799 and 1801, Mexicano was with the combined French and Spanish fleet stationed at Brest after participating in the Croisière de Bruix campaign.
By the end of the Napoleonic Wars Mexicano was laid up at Ferrol, her hull in a bad condition, and at the end of the war the ship was sold out of service and broken up.

References 
 This article is based on a translation of an article from the Spanish Wikipedia.

1786 ships
Ships of the line of the Spanish Navy
Ships built in Cuba